The Alexander von Humboldt Biological Resources Research Institute , sometimes referred to as IAVH, is an independent non-regulatory research institute of the Executive Branch of the Government of Colombia charged with conducting scientific research on the biodiversity of the country including hydrobiology and genetic research. The institute is named after Alexander von Humboldt, a German naturalist who conducted research on the biodiversity of Colombia and Latin America.

See also 
 Ana María Hernández Salgar

References

External links 
 

Research institutes in Colombia
Biological research institutes
Genetics or genomics research institutions
Ministry of Environment and Sustainable Development (Colombia)